Just Be may refer to:

Just Be, a 2004 album by Tiësto
"Just Be" (Tiësto song), the album's title track
Just Be: Remixed, remix album
"Just Be" (Paloma Faith song)